The Hayse Blacksmith Shop, located in Eugene, Oregon, is listed on the National Register of Historic Places.

See also
 National Register of Historic Places listings in Lane County, Oregon

References

Blacksmith shops
National Register of Historic Places in Lane County, Oregon
Buildings and structures completed in 1914
Industrial buildings and structures on the National Register of Historic Places in Oregon
National Register of Historic Places in Eugene, Oregon